Peltophryne peltocephala is a species of toad in the family Bufonidae. It is endemic to Cuba and found in central and eastern Cuba as well as on some outlying islands. 
It occurs in a range of habitats including broadleaf forest, grassland, savanna, and agricultural areas. 
It is a common species but locally threatened by habitat loss.

References

peltocephala
Amphibians described in 1838
Amphibians of Cuba
Endemic fauna of Cuba
Taxonomy articles created by Polbot